The Belgian Fourth Division D was one of the four leagues at the fourth level of the Belgian football league system, the other ones being the Belgian Fourth Division A, B and C.  This division existed from the 1952–53 to 2015–16 seasons and was played every year with 16 clubs in each league. The league was replaced by the Belgian Second Amateur Division.

The season was divided into three periods of ten matches to make a total of 30 games.  The team with the most points was promoted to the Belgian Third Division as champion. The winners of each period (assuming they met the criteria) entered the playoffs (Eindronde in Dutch) with the other nine teams from Promotion A, B and C. The 6 winners went to the second round with the sides who finished 14th in the Third Division. The 4 winners qualified for the final and the 2 winning teams played in the Third Division the following season.

Teams who finished 16th, 15th and 14th were relegated to the Belgian Provincial Leagues. The 13th placed team had to playoff in order to stay in the division.

The final clubs

 — Promoted to replace R.C.S. Verviétois.
 — FC Richelle United finished first of the Liège Division One play-off, qualifying for the Belgian interprovincial play-off, which it won.
 — Promoted to replace C.S. Visé.

See also
Belgian Third Division
Belgian Fourth Division
Belgian Provincial leagues
Belgian football league system

References

D